Poor Señorita is a 2016 Philippine television drama comedy series broadcast by GMA Network. Directed by Dominic Zapata, it stars Regine Velasquez in the title role. It premiered on March 28, 2016 on the network's Telebabad line up replacing Little Nanay. The series concluded on July 15, 2016 with a total of 79 episodes. It was replaced by Encantadia in its timeslot.

The series is streaming online on YouTube.

Premise
Rita was the only daughter of her father, Daniel, who will later die of gastric cancer. Rita will later be diagnosed with gastric cancer like her father and warned that she only have three months left before she dies. Rita decides to give away and donate her assets. She will later discover that she was misdiagnosed. With no money and being pursued by a hitman, Rita hides and meets Kyla, Rambo, Charisse, Apol and Girlie who will help her.

Cast and characters

Lead cast
 Regine Velasquez as Margarita "Rita" Villon-Castillo

Supporting cast
 Mikael Daez as Rafael "Paeng" Castillo
 Sheena Halili as Maika Ramirez Villon
 Kevin Santos as Kilmer / Kimpoy
 Valeen Montenegro as Piper Villon
 Jaya as Edna Logatoc
 Ervic Vijandre as Jordan
 Jillian Ward as Charisse dela Cruz
 Miggs Cuaderno as Apolinario "Apol" dela Cruz
 Zymic Jaranilla as Rambo dela Cruz
 Caprice Mendez as Kimberly "Girlie" Salcedo-Reyes
 Ralph Noriega as Isko
 Snooky Serna as Deborah Villon
 Ayra Mariano as Maria Kyla dela Cruz
 Elyson De Dios as Edison Villon

Recurring cast
 Jojit Lorenzo as Tero
 Geleen Eugenio as Madam Lou
 Rob Sy as Ruben "Drive U Crazy"
 Atak as Hayme
 Beatriz Imperial as Poochie
 Manilyn Reynes as Ligaya Aya de Beauvoir
 Camille Torres as Niña de Beauvoir
 Tess Bomb as Anna
 Divine Tetay as Pepay
 Jelson Bay as Castor
 Mikofresh Cruz as Kikay
 Gladys Reyes as Lydia dela Cruz
 Wilma Guerrero as Bubbles
 Nhett Buenaflor as Blossom
 Wenna Jarito as Buttercup

Guest cast
 Lindsay De Vera as young Rita
 Ricky Davao as Daniel Villon
 Dingdong Dantes as Rafael Buenaventura
 Lauren Young as Vanessa "Bane"
 LJ Reyes as Anjie Batumbakal
 Renz Fernandez as Boyet Reyes
 Diva Montelaba as Minerva Reyes
 Nina Ricci Alagao as Lucy Ferrer
 Gabby Concepcion as Jaime Salcedo (crossover character from Because of You)

Casting
On January 4, 2016, Regine Velasquez renewed her contract with GMA Network. During the contract signing, Velasquez stated that she will be doing a musical-variety-comedy show and a "light" comedy series for 2016. She described her character in the show as "a very different character for me to play." Her last acting role before Poor Señorita was I Heart You, Pare! in 2011.

In a story conference held on January 29, 2016, actresses Snooky Serna and Jaya along with Sheena Halili, Valeen Montenegro, Jillian Ward, Miggs Cuaderno and Zymic Jaranilla joined Velasquez for the series while Mikael Daez acting as her love interest. Dominic Zapata directed the show. StarStruck season 6's finalists Elyson de Dios and Ayra Mariano, who were personally requested by Velasquez herself to be part of her show, also joined the cast. It served as their first drama series after StarStruck.

Ratings
According to AGB Nielsen Philippines' Mega Manila household television ratings, the pilot episode of Poor Senorita earned a 21.5% rating. While the final episode scored a 22% rating.

Accolades

References

External links
 
 

2016 Philippine television series debuts
2016 Philippine television series endings
Comedy-drama television series
Filipino-language television shows
GMA Network drama series
Television shows set in Manila